Surrey First is a civic political organization in Surrey, British Columbia, Canada. It is a non-partisan civic organization, members of which were elected to a majority on Surrey City Council in 2008.

History

Formation 
Surrey First was founded in 2007 by former Surrey Mayor Dianne Watts, who was first elected to a Councillor position on Surrey City Council in 1996 when she was a member of the Surrey Electors Team (SET).  

In 2005, after ongoing philosophical disagreements between SET Mayor Doug McCallum, known to be progressive on social issues and fiscally conservative on economic and tax issues, Watts left SET and challenged Doug McCallum as an independent candidate for mayor. She won a convincing victory and became the first woman to be elected Mayor of Surrey, the second largest city in the province of British Columbia.

Watts embarked upon implementing a series of novel approaches and new ideas to the challenges facing Surrey, including the Surrey Crime Reduction Strategy, which has become a model for cities throughout the world.  Under Watts' leadership, Surrey also became one of the first cities in Canada to implement a Whistleblower Policy aimed at protecting employees who report fraud, waste or abuse of tax dollars at City Hall. She also launched The Homelessness and Housing Foundation with a $9 million endowment, making it the first city in British Columbia to undertake such an initiative.

Other innovative initiatives launched by Watts in her first term include a Respectful Workplace Policy, a Lobbyist Registry and a Livability Accord, an agreement signed between Surrey, Abbotsford, Coquitlam and Langley to collaborate on initiatives related to crime, transportation and growth. These four cities are likely to absorb 70 percent of the growth in Metro Vancouver over the next 20 years.  

Surrey also became the first City in Canada to establish economic investment zones to attract investment and create jobs as part of Watts’ Economic Investment Action Plan.  The Action Plan was rolled-out in the wake of the 2008 financial crisis and was designed to foster strong economic growth through capital investment and strategic partnerships, and support the expansion of clean technology industries.

Soon after the founding of Surrey First, sitting Councillors Linda Hepner, Mary Martin and Barbara Steele resigned from SET to join Watts' slate. Independent Councillor Judy Villeneuve followed suit and thereafter Councillor Tom Gill.

2008–present 
The 2008 municipal election was the first for the Surrey First slate.  On November 15, 2008, Mayor Dianne Watts defeated her lone challenger for the mayor's chair by almost 43,000 votes, and all six members of her Surrey First slate – Judy Villeneuve, Tom Gill, Barbara Steele, Linda Hepner, Mary Martin and then newcomer Barinder Rasode – won seats on Surrey City Council.

Mike Starchuk MLA was a member from 2014 to 2018.

In the October 2018 Election, Linda Annis was the only Surrey First candidate elected City Councillor.

In the 2022 Election, Surrey First  Councillor Linda Annis was re-elected along with Michael Bose.

Electoral results

References 

Municipal political parties in British Columbia
Politics of Surrey, British Columbia
2007 establishments in British Columbia
Political parties established in 2007